Daniel Dewey Barnard (July 16, 1797 – April 24, 1861) was an American politician and a U.S. Representative from New York.

Biography
Born in Sheffield, Massachusetts, Barnard was the son of Timothy and Phebe (Dewey) Barnard. He attended the common schools and graduated from Williams College, Williamstown, Massachusetts, in 1818. He studied law and was admitted to the bar in 1821. He married Sara Livingstone in 1825; and married Catherine Walsh in 1832.

Career
Barnard began practice in Rochester, New York, and served as prosecuting attorney of Monroe County in 1826.

Elected as an Adams to the Twentieth Congress, Barnard served as U.S. Representative for the twenty-seventh district of New York from March 4, 1827, to March 3, 1829. He was an unsuccessful candidate for reelection in 1828 to the Twenty-first Congress. He traveled in Europe in 1831, and moved to Albany, New York, in 1832 and continued the practice of law. He served as a member of the State assembly in 1838.

Barnard was elected as a Whig to the 26th, 27th and 28th United States Congresses, holding office from March 4, 1839, to March 3, 1845. He served as chairman of the Committee on the Judiciary (Twenty-seventh Congress).  As a leading intellectual in the Whig party, Barnard gave a number of speeches, including to the literary societies of Amherst College in 1839 and to Yale Phi Beta Kappa Society in 1846.

Not a candidate for reelection in 1844, Barnard resumed his practice. He was appointed Envoy to Prussia and served from September 3, 1850, to September 21, 1853.  He retired from active business pursuits in 1853 and engaged in literary pursuits, residing in Albany, New York.

Death
Barnard died in Albany, New York, on April 24, 1861 (age 63 years, 282 days). He is interred at Albany Rural Cemetery, Menands, New York where he had given the dedication address in 1844.

References

Bibliography
Penney, Sherry. Patrician in Politics: Daniel Dewey Barnard of New York. Port Washington, N.Y.: Kennikat Press, 1974.

External links

1797 births
1861 deaths
People from Sheffield, Massachusetts
National Republican Party members of the United States House of Representatives from New York (state)
Whig Party members of the United States House of Representatives from New York (state)
Ambassadors of the United States to Germany
19th-century American diplomats
Williams College alumni
Burials at Albany Rural Cemetery
19th-century American politicians